Binghamton is a town in Broome County, New York, United States. The population was 4,623 at the 2020 census. The town is named after an early developer, William Bingham.

The town of Binghamton partly encloses the city of Binghamton on the city's south side.

History 

The region was settled circa 1829, although the part currently within the city of Binghamton was settled in approximately 1802 and called "Chenango Point".

The town of Binghamton was formed in 1855 from a part of the town of Chenango, but part of the new town was lost when the village of Binghamton was first incorporated in 1834, leading in 1867, to the city of Binghamton. This process ultimately removed the northern part of the town along with its river frontage.

Geography

Binghamton is south of the junction of the Susquehanna River and Chenango River and is in the Southern Tier of New York State. The southern town line is the border of Pennsylvania.

Bayless Creek flows northward to the Susquehanna River from the northern part of the town.

Demographics

As of the census of 2000, there were 4,969 people, 1,813 households, and 1,408 families residing in the town.  The population density was 195.4 people per square mile (75.4/km2).  There were 1,911 housing units at an average density of 75.2 per square mile (29.0/km2).  The racial makeup of the town was 96.14% White, 1.25% Black or African American, 0.08% Native American, 0.97% Asian, 0.04% Pacific Islander, 0.38% from other races, and 1.15% from two or more races. Hispanic or Latino of any race were 1.11% of the population.

There were 1,813 households, out of which 35.9% had children under the age of 18 living with them, 64.9% were married couples living together, 8.9% had a female householder with no husband present, and 22.3% were non-families. 18.9% of all households were made up of individuals, and 8.5% had someone living alone who was 65 years of age or older.  The average household size was 2.74 and the average family size was 3.12.

In the town, the population was spread out, with 27.6% under the age of 18, 6.0% from 18 to 24, 27.0% from 25 to 44, 25.9% from 45 to 64, and 13.5% who were 65 years of age or older.  The median age was 40 years. For every 100 females, there were 95.6 males.  For every 100 females age 18 and over, there were 94.2 males.

The median income for a household in the town was $50,676, and the median income for a family was $55,521. Males had a median income of $40,865 versus $27,424 for females. The per capita income for the town was $23,747.  About 4.3% of families and 5.3% of the population were below the poverty line, including 7.5% of those under age 18 and 3.5% of those age 65 or over.

Communities and locations in the Town of Binghamton 
Orchard Park – A residential community, once a large apple orchard, situated along the northern part of Felters Road; most of the streets in this community are named after women of the Greblick family (e.g., Stephanie Lane, Angela Court, Karen Court, Cheryl Drive, and Bernice Boulevard).
Hawleyton – A hamlet named after James Stanton Hawley. It was the only other settlement in the town (with the village of Binghamton) in the 19th century. The community is in the south part of the town on County Road 117. The Old Hawleyton Methodist Episcopal Church was listed on the National Register of Historic Places in 2006.
Park Terrace – A suburban community adjacent to the southern part of the City of Binghamton.
Summit Hill – A hamlet south of Park Terrace on County Road 117.

References

External links
Town of Binghamton official website
 Early history of Binghamton, NY

Binghamton metropolitan area
Towns in Broome County, New York